Jhusi or Jhunsi is a town and a  part of Allahabad municipal corporation in Allahabad district in the Indian state of Uttar Pradesh. It was formerly called   Pratishthan Pur or Puri.

The place is also noted for being one of the Neolithic sites, that provides one of the earliest evidence of farming in South Asia.

Geography
It is the biggest town area in Allahabad district. It is located on the banks of Ganges River  Just like Naini it is also a twin city to Prayagraj: It is connected to main city by Lal Bahudar Shastri Bridge
Jhusi has avas vikas colony yojna 2 and 3, there is 10000 houses in avas vikas colony. And jhusi has many other private colonies.
Circle rate of jhusi 10500.

Demographics
 India census, Jhusi had a population of 33,901 including the populations of Jhusi nagar panchayat and Jhusi Kohna census town, 13,878 and 20,023 respectively.

History
Archeological site near the confluence of the Ganges and Yamuna rivers yielded a C14 dating of 7106 BCE to 7080 for its Neolithic levels. Historically, Jhusi was known as Prathisthanpuram.

Prayag's past buried at Jhusi
The historian Dr. D. P. states it once belonged to the rulers of Mauryan, Shunga, Kushana and Gupta period, the ancient Pratisthana has lost its identity to the modernity of Jhusi. The only evidence related to this historical fact is still visible in the shape of high mounds in Jhusi. Surprisingly, these high mounds have further added to the significance of the city as the articles excavated from here belong to the sixth century BC and antiquities belonging to five cultural phases ranging from chalcolithic to early medieval period have been found here. As per the historians and the pre NBP ware deposit the site of Kumbh Mela is marked at this place as the earliest culture represented at the site. Early layer of this deposit has yielded iron objects. Some pottery items and antiquities are similar to those found at different chalcolithic sites in UP, Bihar and Northern Vindhyas. From the pre-NBP Ware period to the Gupta period there had been continuous settlement at the site. However, there appears to be a cultural gap between the end of Gupta period and the beginning of early medieval period. "There is every likelihood that the site may show up no gap at all when excavated extensively. This possibility is based on the strategic location of the site itself which, by virtue of the same reason, would have never been abandoned after having been once occupied. The excavations in the area only hint at the above fact. The ruins of ancient Pratishthana which are represented by the high mounds of Jhunsi on the eastern bank of Ganges are spread over an area of about four square miles. Pratishthana was the most important locality of Prayag and it was founded by king Ila and was the capital of Pururavas and other kings of Lunar dynasty Kalidasa too mentions about Pratishthana in his drama Vikramor-vasiyam. He has given an imaginary account of this palace of Pururavas which was magnificent. Various myths are also associated with this site. An inscription of Trilochanapala, the Pratihara king, was discovered from the site in 1830. In his book, VN Pandey mentions that the naming of Jhunsi too has a legend associated with it. It was once ruled by Har-bonga, an imbecile and foolish king in whose reign chaos prevailed everywhere. When the cup of his inequity was full there was an upheaval on the earth and the capital Pratishthana was turned upside down, hence now known as 'Ulta Quila'.

There was a conflagration which completed the destruction of the city and the ruins went by the name of Jhulsi, a burnt town, from the Hindi root jhulasna. It is also said that the town was destroyed in an earthquake in 1359 CE as a result of the invocations of saint Maqdoom Shah Taqiuddin, whose tomb lies on one side of the fortress. Dubey states these traditions and the etymological meaning of the name Jhusi possibly indicate to the destruction and burning of the site by the Muslim invaders in the thirteenth century C.E. He adds that traditions relating to the scattering of Brahmana and Kshatriya clans abandoning their homes in Jhusi and emigrating to distant places during the medieval period lend colour to this theory. 

There is also the historical and sacred Samudrakoop here, which has its own story. "It is known as Samudrakoop since it belongs to the period of Samudragupta. In fact five such wells are found in Ujjain, Mathura, Prayag (Allahabad), Varanasi and Patalpur. It was dumped with garbage once but the efforts of a sage Dayaram brought its historical importance to limelight." Research on lost heritage of Allahabad under Indian National Trust for Art and Cultural Heritage (INTACH) suggests that the site is slowly losing its identity on account of continuous erosion of Ganges river. "The high mound, which belong to Kushana period, has few bricks exposed right now".

Schools, colleges and institutes
 Govind Ballabh Pant Social Science Institute
 Harish-Chandra Research Institute
 DR Singh Convent School, Poore Surdas, New Jhunsi
Centre academy higher secondary school and central academy school for little student. New RSJ public school.
UD inter college.nayay nagar public school and many other private school

References

External links
 Govt. website 

Cities and towns in Allahabad district
Archaeology of India
Archaeological sites in Uttar Pradesh